Elliot Hegarty is a film and television director working in Britain and the United States.

His film and TV credits include Ted Lasso starring Jason Sudeikis for Apple TV which won 7 Emmys in 2021, the highly-acclaimed Cheaters for BBC1, two film adaptations of David Walliams' books - The Midnight Gang with Alan Davies and Haydn Gwynne and Grandpa's Great Escape with Tom Courtenay and Jennifer Saunders. He also directed Lizzie and Sarah by Julia Davis, Lovesick on Netflix, Star Stories, The Kevin Bishop Show, FM, Moving Wallpaper, Great Night Out and Jack Whitehall's TV series - Bad Education. In the US Elliot has directed over 35 episodes of TV across a broad range of Network comedies such as Black-ish, The Real O'Neals, Mr. Sunshine, The Middle, Suburgatory, Selfie, Trophy Wife, Family Tools and Mixology. 

His two feature film credits are The Bad Education Movie and the 2000 film County Kilburn starring Ciarán McMenamin, a film he also wrote.

Elliot also directs commercials. The first three ads he directed were for Club 18–30, for which he won eight awards, including a Silver and two Bronzes at the British Television Advertising awards and a Bronze Lion at Cannes. He was nominated as Best New Director at the British Television Advertising Craft awards in 2000 and selected for the prestigious New Directors’ Showcase in Cannes 2001. He has worked with such clients as Guinness, MFI, KFC, Toyota, Npower, Enterprise, Hyundai and the Daily Telegraph.

He has been twice nominated for a BAFTA award - in 2008 and again in 2018. He won Best Comedy at the British Comedy Awards.

References

External links

1971 births
English expatriates in the United States
English film directors
English screenwriters
English male screenwriters
English television directors
Living people
Writers from London
Date of birth missing (living people)
Alumni of the London Film School